Charlotte station may refer to:

Charlotte station (Amtrak), an Amtrak train station in Charlotte, North Carolina
Charlotte station (Seaboard Air Line Railroad), Seaboard Air Line station in Charlotte, North Carolina
Charlotte Transportation Center, an intermodal transit station in Charlotte, North Carolina
Any station in Charlotte
Joséphine-Charlotte metro station, a Brussels metro station
Michigan Central Railroad Charlotte Depot